Alighiero Noschese (25 November 1932 – 3 December 1979) was an Italian TV impersonator and actor.

Life and career 
Noschese  was born in Naples. After an unsuccessful attempt to work as journalist, he debuted for Italian radio as imitator and parodist. After some theatre appearances with Pietro Garinei and Sandro Giovannini, he became popular with the TV show Doppia coppia (1969), where, for the first time in the then wholly state-controlled Italian television, an actor was allowed to parody politicians.

Noschese had an outstanding capability for imitating not only the voice of his subjects, but also their physical features and attitudes. In an interview just before his death, Noschese listed a total of 1,156 voices he had imitated in his career.

On 3 December 1979, at the peak of his career, Noschese shot himself while under care for clinical depression in Rome. However, as firearms and other letal objects are not allowed to depressed patients, it is suspected that someone murdered Noschese or smuggled the gun to him.

Selected filmography 
 Doctor Antonio (1954)
 I due della legione (1962) - Mustafa Abdul Bey
 Obiettivo ragazze (1963) - Giuseppe Quagliarulo
 Scanzonatissimo (1963)
 James Tont operazione U.N.O. (1965) - Noskes
 Mercanti di vergini (1969)
 Io non scappo... fuggo (1970)
 Io non spezzo... rompo (1971) - Riccardo Viganò
 Il furto è l'anima del commercio?!... (1971) - Conte Gaetano Gargiulo
 Io non vedo, tu non parli, lui non sente (1971) - Luigi Gorletti
 Boccaccio (1972) - Lambertuccio De Cecina
 Il terrore con gli occhi storti (1972) - Giacinto Puddu
 The Mighty Anselmo and His Squire (1972) - Il prode Anselmo da Montebello
 The Funny Face of the Godfather (1973) - Don Vito Monreale / Nick Bullione
 Unbelievable Adventures of Italians in Russia (1974) - Antonio Lo Mazzo (final film role)

References

External links 

 

1932 births
1979 suicides
Male actors from Naples
Italian male comedians
Italian impressionists (entertainers)
Italian television personalities
Suicides by firearm in Italy
20th-century Italian male actors
20th-century Italian comedians
1979 deaths